The 950s decade ran from January 1, 950, to December 31, 959.

Significant people
 Abd al-Rahman III caliph of Córdoba
 Al-Muti caliph of Baghdad
 Al-Mu'izz li-Din Allah of Fatimid dynasty
 Pope John XII
 Pope Agapetus II

References